Salvia granatensis is a species of Salvia from southern Spain.

References

External links
 
 

Flora of Spain
granatensis
Plants described in 1941